Ceropegia linearis is a species of flowering plant in the family Apocynaceae, native to Southern Africa.

The popular houseplant Ceropegia woodii is sometimes treated as a subspecies of C. linearis, as C. linearis subsp. woodii. It has gained the Royal Horticultural Society's Award of Garden Merit.

References

linearis